Five ships of the Royal Navy have borne the name HMS Shoreham after the port town of Shoreham-by-Sea in Sussex:

  was a 32-gun fifth rate launched in 1694. She was rebuilt as a 20-gun sixth rate in 1720, and was sold in 1744.
  was a 24-gun sixth rate launched in 1744 and sold in 1758.
  was a  sloop launched in 1930. She was sold into mercantile service in 1946 and renamed Jorge Fel Joven. She was broken up in 1950.

See also

References
 

Royal Navy ship names